The men's heavyweight event was part of the boxing programme at the 1988 Summer Olympics. The weight class allowed boxers of up to 91 kilograms to compete. The competition was held from 22 September to 1 October 1988. 18 boxers from 18 nations competed. 27-year-old Ray Mercer, who took up boxing only four years prior, won the gold medal.

Medalists

Results
The following boxers took part in the event:

First round
 Tom Glesby (CAN) def. Claus Nielsen (DEN), RSC-2
 Gyula Alvics (HUN) def. José Ortega (ESP), 5:0

Second round
 Maik Heydeck (GDR) def. Juan Antonio Diaz (ARG), 5:0
 Baik Hyun-Man (KOR) def. Zeljko Mavrovic (YUG), 5:0
 Andrzej Golota (POL) def. Svilen Rusinov (BUL), 5:0
 Harold Obunga (KEN) def. Tualau Fale (TNG), RSC-1
 Luigi Gaudiano (ITA) def. Ramzan Sebiyev (URS), 3:2
 Ray Mercer (USA) def. Rudolf Gavenciak (TCH), RSC-3
 Arnold Vanderlyde (HOL) def. Henry Akinwande (GBR), 3:2
 Gyula Alvics (HUN) def. Tom Glesby (CAN), RSC-2

Quarterfinals
 Baik Hyun-Man (KOR) def. Maik Heydeck (GDR), RSC-1
 Andrzej Golota (POL) def. Harold Obunga (KEN), 5:0
 Ray Mercer (USA) def. Luigi Gaudiano (ITA), KO-1
 Arnold Vanderlyde (HOL) def. Gyula Alvics (HUN), 5:0

Semifinals
 Baik Hyun-Man (KOR) def. Andrzej Golota (POL), RSC-2
 Ray Mercer (USA) def. Arnold Vanderlyde (HOL), RSC-2

Final
 Ray Mercer (USA) def. Baik Hyun-Man (KOR), KO-1

References

Heavyweight